Ginger Snaps is an American adult animated sitcom created by Sono Patel. The series premiered on June 22, 2017 on ABCd.

It was not renewed for a second season despite the finale ended with Kishy and the other Ginger Snaps planning to stage a rebellion against Calista.

Plot
In the middle of a quiet suburb, a power-hungry pre-teen dreams of making her cookie selling troop the most powerful clique. With the moral compass of a movie gangster, she is willing to use everything from her family, friends, and even a schoolmate's terminal cancer diagnosis as leverage in her quest for cookie world domination. Cookies must be sold, and power will be grabbed, no matter the cost!

Characters
 Lauren Lapkus as Calista, a cynical, power hungry pre-teen girl and the founder of the Ginger Snaps. Her main goal is to sell cookies and get money from them. She has issues expressing affection for others as refers to her friends as "business partners" and has yet to find a reason as to why she should care about her mother or sister.
 Aparna Nancherla as Kishy, a happy girl who throughout the first season tries to be a Ginger Snap. She is hated by Calista since Kishy is nice to everyone and does a more efficient job than her.
 Cree Summer as Rachel, she is Calista's second in command. She and Calista used to have a feud but eventually became friends.
 Kari Wahlgren as Jenny and Penny, two creepy twins who are the muscle of the group. They are both skilled in many types of weaponry.
 Ashley Tisdale as Apple, she is the older sister of Calista. She is a cheerleader at school. She loves Calista's cookies and frequently tries to steal them. She and her sister don't seem to really appreciate each other and they both seem to only want to cause harm to each other.
 Josh Keaton as Hemmingway, a boy at Calista's school, whom she has a crush on, but Hemmingway actually likes Kishy.
 Maria Bamford as Vivien, Calista and Apple's single mother. She doesn't have a good relationship with Calista and Vivien is seen frequently trying to make a connection with her.
 Benjamin Diskin as Patrick, a football jock and Apple's boyfriend.

Episodes

Series overview
<onlyinclude>{| class="wikitable" style="text-align:center;"
|-
! colspan="2" | Season
! Episodes
! Originally released
|-
| style="background:#006600;"|
| 1
| 9
| June 22, 2017
|-
|}

Season 1 (2017)

References

External links

2017 web series debuts
2010s American adult animated television series
2010s American sitcoms
American adult animated comedy television series
American adult animated web series
American animated sitcoms
American comedy web series
Animated television series about children
Television series by Blue Ribbon Content